Hatt may refer to:

Places
 Hatt, Cornwall, England
 Hatt Building, on the National Register of Historic Places listings in Napa County, California

Other uses
 Hatt (surname)
 Arabic خط (ḫaṭṭ: "line, writing"), everyday Arabic handwriting or script in contrast to style and system requirements of calligraphy Cf. :ar:خط (توضيح) (Hatt, disambiguation)
 Hijazi script (خط حجازي ḫaṭṭ ḥiǧāzī). 
 Hatt-i humayun, edict of the Ottoman government (e.g. Hatt-ı Hümayun of 1856)
 Help authoring tools and Techniques, a software program used to create help documents
 The Hatt family, fictional characters including Sir Topham Hatt, The Fat Controller, the head of the railway in The Railway Series of books written by Rev W. V. Awdry

See also
 Hat (disambiguation)
 Hats (disambiguation)
 Het (disambiguation)
 Hett (disambiguation)